Anton Fink (born 30 July 1987) is a German professional footballer who plays as a striker for Oberliga Baden-Württemberg club FC Nöttingen. He has scored the most 3. liga goals of all time (136).

Career
After playing youth football with SC Maisach and TSV 1860 Munich, Fink has played senior football for SpVgg Unterhaching, Karlsruher SC, VfR Aalen and Chemnitzer FC.

Between 2017 and 2020 he had second, three-year spell with Karlsruher SC at the end of which he helped the club avoid relegation from the 2. Bundesliga, scoring 3 goals in 22 appearances.

On 1 July 2020, Fink joined Regionalliga Südwest side SSV Ulm 1846 having agreed a two-year contract.

On 4 July 2022 FC Nöttingen announced that Fink will join them.

Career statistics

References

1987 births
People from Dachau
Sportspeople from Upper Bavaria
Footballers from Bavaria
Living people
Association football forwards
German footballers
TSV 1860 Munich players
SpVgg Unterhaching players
Karlsruher SC players
VfR Aalen players
Chemnitzer FC players
SSV Ulm 1846 players
FC Nöttingen players
3. Liga players
2. Bundesliga players
Regionalliga players
Oberliga (football) players